The Mathematics Enthusiast is a triannual peer-reviewed open access academic journal covering undergraduate mathematics, mathematics education, including historical, philosophical, and cross-cultural perspectives on mathematics. It is hosted by ScholarWorks at the University of Montana. The journal was established in 2004 and its founding editor-in-chief is Bharath Sriraman. The journal exists as an independent entity in order to give authors full copyright over their articles, and is not affiliated with any commercial publishing companies.

Abstracting and indexing 
The journal is abstracted and indexed in Academic Search Complete, Emerging Sources Citation Index, PsycINFO, and Scopus.

References

External links 
 

Triannual journals
English-language journals
Mathematics education journals
Open access journals
Publications established in 2004
University of Montana
Academic journals associated with universities and colleges of the United States